Washington's 40th legislative district is one of forty-nine districts in Washington state for representation in the state legislature.

The district includes San Juan County as well as portions of Whatcom and Skagit counties.

The district's legislators are state senator Liz Lovelett and state representatives Debra Lekanoff (position 1) and Alex Ramel (position 2), all Democrats.

See also
Washington Redistricting Commission
Washington State Legislature
Washington State Senate
Washington House of Representatives

References

External links
Washington State Redistricting Commission
Washington House of Representatives
Map of Legislative Districts

40